Bodega Catena Zapata is a family-owned winery located in Mendoza, in the sub appellation of Agrelo, Argentina.  The winery structure is distinguished by its pyramid-like design based on Mayan architecture.

The winery was founded in 1902 by Italian immigrant Nicola Catena and was passed to his son Domingo. Domingo’s son, Nicolás Catena Zapata (A.K.A. Nicolás Catena), was a pioneer to introduce European winemaking techniques to Argentina, including the introduction of Malbec and vine growing in high altitudes. Nicolás Catena’s daughter, Laura Catena, and other members of the Zapata family, have also been involved in the winery.

References

External links
 Bodega Catena Zapata

Wineries of Argentina
Mendoza winery
Food and drink companies established in 1902
Winemaker of the year awards
Argentine brands
Wine brands
1902 establishments in Argentina